Plasmid RNAIII is a non-coding RNA found in bacterial plasmids including pIP501. RNAIII acts by transcriptional attenuation of the essential repR-mRNA. RNAIII is composed of four stem-loops with loops L3 and L4 that interact with the RNA target.

References

External links 
 

Non-coding RNA